San Cristóbal is a province in the southern region of Dominican Republic, located west of the capital Santo Domingo. With approximately 642,000 inhabitants, it is the fourth most populated province in the country, only behind Santo Domingo, Santiago and the National District. It borders the provinces Monseñor Nouel (north), Monte Plata (northeast), Santo Domingo (east), Peravia (west) and San José de Ocoa (northwest). The Caribbean Sea borders the province to the south. The provincial capital is the city of San Cristóbal.

It was originally named Trujillo after the dictator Rafael Leónidas Trujillo, taking its present name after his assassination in 1961. It included what is now Monte Plata Province until 1992. The provincial capital is San Cristóbal.

Geography

San Cristóbal is located in a valley surrounded by hills. Its climate is tropical with frequent rains, temperatures can fluctuate often. Foothills of the Cordillera Central are occupying a large part of the province, especially in the northwest. In addition there are other small elevations to the East and South (for example, the Lomas de Duveaux, south of Yaguate). The main rivers in the province are the Haina River, which constitutes the eastern limit of the province; the Nizao, which forms the border with the Peravia province, and the Nigua. Other rivers are Mana, Yubaso (or Blanco), La Toma and the Itabo, Sainaguá and Najayo streams.

Economy

The downtown capital area is the main financial, commercial and industrial center of the province, as well as the main educational and political centers (Government, City Hall). Economic activities are influenced by the fact that it is the main city closest to Santo Domingo. The industry (in San Cristóbal and the free zones of Bajos de Haina, Nigua and Villa Altagracia), small-scale agriculture (except citrus plantations in Villa Altagracia, coffee in the mountains and onions in the plains of Najayo-Palenque) and ports (in Bajos de Haina and Palenque). It has good tourist activity, especially from national tourists who visit from Santo Domingo. The main centers are the beaches of Najayo, Palenque, El Balnearios de La Toma and the rivers Haina and Nizao.  

The province has considerable sources of jobs, in which the Nestlé factory the Sancela family group plant, the Goya processing plant as well as the glass industrial park, the free zones of Itabo, Nigua and the armory, the CEDELCA washbasin, the Dominican Quala factory, the Domicen cement and colon cement plants, the tropic products (coco López) manufactures as well as the marmotech, Tecnotiles and Star marble plants, among others Business. However, due to its proximity to Santo Domingo, the population moves to work in the capital city, as well as the populations of Bajos de Haina and nigua.

Currently, San Cristóbal is one of the cities with the best rates in the area of telecommunications. It has the services of the main telephone companies in the country, as well as various cable and satellite television companies.

Municipalities and municipal districts

The province as of June 20, 2006 is divided into the following  municipalities (municipios) and municipal districts (distrito municipal - D.M.) within them:

Bajos de Haina
El Carril (D.M.)
San Cristóbal
Cambita Garabitos
Cambita El Pueblecito (D.M.)
Los Cacaos
Sabana Grande de Palenque
Hato Damas (D.M.)
San Gregorio de Nigua
Yaguate
Villa Altagracia
La Cuchilla (D.M.)
Medina (D.M.)
San José del Puerto (D.M.)

The following is a sortable table of the municipalities and municipal districts with population figures as of the 2012 census. Urban population are those living in the seats (cabeceras literally heads) of municipalities or of municipal districts. Rural population are those living in the districts (Secciones literally sections) and neighborhoods (Parajes literally places) outside of them.

For comparison with the municipalities and municipal districts of other provinces see the list of municipalities and municipal districts of the Dominican Republic.

See also

 Governor of San Cristóbal

References

External links
  Oficina Nacional de Estadística, Statistics Portal of the Dominican Republic
  Oficina Nacional de Estadística, Maps with administrative
  News of San Cristobal Dominican Republic  division of the provinces of the Dominican Republic

 
Provinces of the Dominican Republic
States and territories established in 1932